Scophthalmus is a genus of turbots, relatively large flatfish native to the northeast Atlantic Ocean, Baltic Sea, Mediterranean Sea and Black Sea.

Species 
There are currently four recognized species in this genus:
Scophthalmus aquosus (Mitchill, 1815) (Windowpane flounder)
Scophthalmus maeoticus (Pallas, 1814) (Black-Sea Turbot)
Scophthalmus maximus (Linnaeus, 1758) (Turbot)
Scophthalmus rhombus (Linnaeus, 1758) (Brill)

References

 
Marine fish genera
Taxa named by Constantine Samuel Rafinesque